Robert Ward (died 1405), of York, was an English merchant, trading in wool and cloth, and a Member of Parliament.

He was a Member (MP) of the Parliament of England for City of York in 1402.

References

14th-century births
1405 deaths
15th-century English people
People from York
Members of the Parliament of England (pre-1707)